Akure North is a Local Government Area in Ondo State, Nigeria. Its headquarters are in the town of Iju/Itaogbolu.

  
The postal code of the area is 340.

References

Local Government Areas in Ondo State